Mark Mancuso (born in West Newton, Massachusetts) is an American meteorologist formerly employed by The Weather Channel in Atlanta, Georgia and now with AccuWeather in State College, Pennsylvania. He graduated from Pennsylvania State University with a B.S. in Meteorology.

Career
Mark was a meteorologist for WITN-TV in Washington, North Carolina. In the 1970s and early 1980s he held the chief meteorologist position at WATE-TV in Knoxville, Tennessee. In 1982, he joined The Weather Channel as one of the original on-camera meteorologists. His specialties include satellite and radar interpretation, short range forecasting, weather observing, and tropical meteorology. He was laid off from The Weather Channel on February 1, 2009 and currently works at The AccuWeather Channel.

He also made a short appearance in the movie Home Alone 3.

Family
Mark has twin girls, one son, and one cat.

References

External links
 The Weather Channel Official Website
 Mark Mancuso bio at AccuWeather
 

American television meteorologists
Penn State College of Earth and Mineral Sciences alumni
People from Newton, Massachusetts
Year of birth missing (living people)
Living people
The Weather Channel people